K. Balakrishnan is an Indian politician and a former member of the Tamil Nadu Legislative Assembly from the Chidambaram constituency. He represents the Communist Party of India (Marxist) party. He currently serves as the State Secretary of CPI(M) Tamil Nadu Unit

From his college days in Annamalai University, he was involved in politics and is continuously fighting against injustice and working for people's welfare. 

On 2 September 2015, Balakrishnan was arrested for refusing to call off a protest at a train station as part of a strike. He later complained of uneasiness and was taken to the Rajah Muthiah Medical College and Hospital at Chidambaram where he was treated for his illness.He was appointed as State Secretary of CPI(M) Tamil Nadu on Feb 21 2018.

References 

Communist Party of India (Marxist) politicians from Tamil Nadu
Members of the Tamil Nadu Legislative Assembly
Living people
1953 births
People from Cuddalore district